Moisés Sánchez Parra (born September 21, 1980 in Palma de Mallorca) is a retired amateur Spanish Greco-Roman wrestler, who competed in the men's welterweight category. He represented his nation Spain at the 2004 Summer Olympics and later capped his sporting career in 2005 with a silver and bronze at the Mediterranean Games and European Championships. Before his retirement from wrestling in 2010, Sanchez trained full-time for Budokan Wrestling Club in Palma de Mallorca under his coach Eusebio Capel.

Sanchez qualified for the Spanish squad in the men's 66 kg class at the 2004 Summer Olympics in Athens. Earlier in the process, he finished second at the Olympic Qualification Tournament in Tashkent, Uzbekistan to guarantee his spot on the returning Spanish wrestling team after a 12-year hiatus. He lost two straight matches each to Kyrgyzstan's Kanatbek Begaliev (1–9) and Iran's Parviz Zeidvand (1–3) that left him on the bottom of the prelim pool, placing eighteenth in the final standings. As two wrestlers were both disqualified by a forfeit in the fifth-place match, Sanchez's position was upgraded to sixteenth.

In 2005, Sanchez overcame his Olympic setback to pick up a bronze medal in the 66-kg division at the European Championships in Varna, Bulgaria. When Spain hosted the Mediterranean Games in Almería a few months later, Sanchez lost his final match to Turkey's Selçuk Çebi, and received a silver medal to the delight of the home crowd. He also sought his second bid for the 2008 Summer Olympics in Beijing, but failed to earn a spot from two Olympic Qualification Tournaments.

Notes

References

External links
 
 
 

1980 births
Living people
Olympic wrestlers of Spain
Wrestlers at the 2004 Summer Olympics
Sportspeople from Palma de Mallorca
Spanish male sport wrestlers
Mediterranean Games silver medalists for Spain
Competitors at the 2005 Mediterranean Games
Mediterranean Games medalists in wrestling
European Wrestling Championships medalists
20th-century Spanish people
21st-century Spanish people